Policlinico is a station on line 1 of the Naples Metro. It was opened on 28 May 1993 as part of the inaugural section of Naples Metro, between Vanvitelli and Colli Aminei. The station is located between Rione Alto and Colli Aminei.

References

Naples Metro stations
Railway stations opened in 1993
1993 establishments in Italy
Railway stations in Italy opened in the 20th century
Railway stations in Italy opened in the 21st century